Roman baths are thermae.

Historic examples of Roman Baths include:
Aïn Doura Baths, a ruin in Dougga, Tunisia 
Għajn Tuffieħa Roman Baths, a ruin in Malta
Roman Baths of Ankara, a ruin in Ankara, Turkey
Roman Baths (Bath), a well-preserved site in England
Roman Baths, Beirut, Lebanon
Roman baths of Toledo, a ruin in Toledo, Spain
Roman Baths Museum, inside the remains of the fortress of Isca Augusta at Caerleon, Wales
Roman Baths, Strand Lane, a cold spring bath near London, reputedly of Roman origin
Thermae Bath Spa, a historic spa with a contemporary spa in Bath, England
Welwyn Roman Baths, a ruin near Welwyn Garden City, England

Other 
Roman Baths (Potsdam), a 19th-century Roman-inspired royal complex in Germany
The Roman Bath, a 1974 Bulgarian play

See also
 List of Roman public baths